FC United is a women's football club from Jakobstad, Finland, playing in the Finnish women's fourth tier Naisten Kolmonen. FC United was originally known as the women's section of FF Jaro and the current club was established in 1993.

Club honours 
Finnish League: 2002, 2004
Finnish Cup: 2001, 2004, 2005

European record

Former internationals 
 Emmi Alanen
 Rita Chikwelu
 Katri Nokso-Koivisto
 Leena Puranen
 Cynthia Uwak
 Petra Vaelma

Sources

External links 
FC United Official Homepage (in Swedish and Finnish)

Women's football clubs in Finland
Association football clubs established in 1993
Jakobstad